The 1998 Supertaça Cândido de Oliveira was the 20th edition of the Supertaça Cândido de Oliveira, the annual Portuguese football season-opening match contested by the winners of the previous season's top league and cup competitions (or cup runner-up in case the league- and cup-winning club is the same). The 1998 Supertaça Cândido de Oliveira was contested over two legs, and opposed two Primeira Liga sides Braga and Porto. Porto qualified for the SuperCup by winning the 1997–98 Primeira Divisão and the 1997–98 Taça de Portugal, whilst Braga gained entry into the competition as the cup runners-up due to the Dragões claiming both league and cup in the same season.

The first leg which took place at the Estádio das Antas, saw Porto win 1–0 thanks to a Zlatko Zahovič goal. The second leg which took place at the Estádio Primeiro de Maio, saw a 1–1 tie between both sides, and thus allow Porto to win 2–1 on aggregate over two legs which would give the Portistas their tenth Supertaça Cândido de Oliveira.

First leg

Details

Second leg

Details

References

Supertaça Cândido de Oliveira
1998–99 in Portuguese football
FC Porto matches
S.C. Braga matches